Acutitornus leucostola is a species of moth in the family Gelechiidae. It was described by Anthonie Johannes Theodorus Janse in 1958. It is found in South Africa.

References

Endemic moths of South Africa
Apatetrinae
Moths described in 1958
Moths of Africa